Benjamina is a feminine given name and may refer to:

Benjamina Karić (1991), Bosnian politician

See also 

 Benjamin (name)
 Benjaminas

Feminine given names